Ylva Thörn (born 2 August 1954) is a Swedish politician and former trade unionist.

Born in Åtvidaberg, Thörn became a nursing assistant in 1974, initially in Åtvidaberg and then in Linköping.  She joined the Swedish Municipal Workers' Union (Kommunal), and began working full-time for the union in 1987, as a regional officer.  She became president of Kommunal in 1996, and in 2002 additionally became president of the Public Services International.

Thörn left her union posts in 2010, and started working for the Swedish Social Democratic Party, becoming deputy general secretary of the party in 2012.  In 2015, she was appointed as Governor of Dalarna County.

References

1954 births
Living people
People from Åtvidaberg Municipality
Swedish Social Democratic Party politicians
Swedish trade unionists